René Andrle (born 1 April 1974, in Litoměřice) is a former Czech professional road bicycle racer.

Major results

1995
 Czech Republic Road Race Champion
1996
 2nd, National Road Race Championship
1997
 1st, Stage 6, Tour of Austria
1999
 1st, Stage 3, Ytong Bohemia Tour
2000
 1st, Overall, Tour of Slovakia
 Winner Stage 5 (ITT)
2001
 62nd, Overall, Giro d'Italia
 3rd, Prologue
2002
 1st, Stage 5, Vuelta a Murcia
2004
 3rd, National Road Race Championship
2006
 1st, Stage 6, Dookoła Mazowsza
 3rd, National Road Race Championship
2007
 2nd, National Time Trial Championship

External links

1974 births
Living people
Czech male cyclists
Olympic cyclists of the Czech Republic
Cyclists at the 2004 Summer Olympics
People from Litoměřice
Sportspeople from the Ústí nad Labem Region